James Wallace (birth unknown – death unknown) was an English professional rugby league footballer who played in the 1920s.

International honours
Jim Wallace won caps for England while at St. Helens Recs in 1925 against Wales, in 1926 against Other Nationalities, and won a cap for Great Britain while at St. Helens Recs in 1926 against New Zealand.

References

England national rugby league team players
English rugby league players
Great Britain national rugby league team players
Place of birth missing
Place of death missing
Rugby league wingers
St Helens Recreation RLFC players
Year of birth missing
Year of death missing